Ecclesiastes 7 is the seventh chapter of the Book of Ecclesiastes in the Hebrew Bible or the Old Testament of the Christian Bible. The book contains philosophical speeches by a character called '(the) Qoheleth' ("the Teacher"), composed probably between the 5th and 2nd centuries BC. Peshitta, Targum, and Talmud attribute the authorship of the book to King Solomon. 

This chapter deals with suffering and sin. The style of the first half (verses 1–14) is similar to that of the 'sentence literature' collections (such as ) and, as in such collections, the sayings are linked by catchwords and thematic ties with the previous ones, with a series of "better ... than" presenting dialectic pairs of issues. The second half exposes the 'crookedness of life' (verse 13) that moves to the 'crookedness of humanity' (verse 29).

Text
The original text was written in Hebrew. This chapter is divided into 29 verses. The Latin Vulgate has 30 verses, as it includes  as verse 7:1.

Textual witnesses
Some early manuscripts containing the text of this chapter in Hebrew are of the Masoretic Text, which includes Codex Leningradensis (1008). Fragments containing parts of this chapter were found among the Dead Sea Scrolls 4QQoh (4Q109; 175-150 BC; extant verses 1–10, 19–20).

There is also a translation into Koine Greek known as the Septuagint, made in the last few centuries BC. Extant ancient manuscripts of the Septuagint version include Codex Vaticanus (B; B; 4th century), Codex Sinaiticus (S; BHK: S; 4th century), and Codex Alexandrinus (A; A; 5th century). The Greek text is probably derived from the work of Aquila of Sinope or his followers.

Structure
In the Jerusalem Bible, this chapter opens Part Two of the book, and verses 1-7 are presented as a "prologue" comparable to the opening prologue in Ecclesiastes 1:4-11. E. H. Plumptre sees this chapter as an interruption to the "sequence of thought" being developed in chapter 6. The New American Bible (Revised Edition) divides the chapter into three parts, with verses 1-14 providing a "critique of [the] sages on the Day of Adversity", verses 15 a "critique of [the] sages on Justice and Wickedness", and verses 26-29 a "critique of [the] advice of women".

Instructive suffering (7:1–6)
This section gives the first instruction about suffering, to be followed by the exposition about its dangers in hindering wisdom (verses 7–10). As a funeral may cause one to think about life, whereas a party probably not, visits to 'house of mourning' may bring more valuable lessons for inner character, enabling true resolutions in one's life.

Verse 1
A good name is better than precious ointment,
And the day of death than the day of one’s birth.
This verse opens a series of maxims continuing to verse 5. There is an alliteration in the Hebrew is hidden in English translation: A good name (shem) is better than good ointment (shemen).

Four dangers (7:7–10)
The four dangers to hinder wisdom are: corruption (verse 7), impatience (verse 8), bitterness (verse 9) and nostalgia (verse 10). To deal with these one needs to take 'a long-term view of life when reacting to adversity'.

The need of wisdom (7:11–12)
Wisdom, like a land which could be given as an inheritance, belongs to God but is granted to his people, and it has a deeper level of protective power than wealth.

Life under God (7:13–14)
Both good times and bad times are God-ordained and purposeful, so people should accept good when accessible and face adversity when it becomes reality.

Neither too wise nor too foolish (7:15–22)
This part states the 'inadvisability of extreme righteousness and wisdom', with the advice to adopt only some parts of wisdom, 'neither to be too wise and righteous, nor too foolish and wicked', but 'a bit of both', as those who fear God will succeed in both or 'escape the consequences of doing neither'.

The Search for integrity (7:23–29)
The section suggests that it is not so easy to find wisdom nor any 'definitive explanation of the world'. It closes with Qoheleth's ironic commentary in Ecclesiastes 8:1.

Verse 26And I find something more bitter than death: the woman whose heart is snares and nets, and whose hands are fetters. He who pleases God escapes her, but the sinner is taken by her.''
The statements in this verse are not a polemic against women, but an allegorical warning against "Folly", described as an evilly seductive woman (cf. Proverbs 2:16-19; 5:20; 6:24-35; 7:5-27; 23:27-28), who is on a hunt to catch sinful people.
"He who pleases God": Literally, "He who is good before God"

See also
Memento mori
Related Bible parts: Proverbs 2, 5, 6, 7, 10, 23

Notes

References

Sources

External links

 Jewish translations:
 Kohelet – Ecclesiastes - Chapter 7 (Judaica Press) translation [with Rashi's commentary] at Chabad.org
 Christian translations:
 Online Bible at GospelHall.org (ESV, KJV, Darby, American Standard Version, Bible in Basic English)
 Ecclesiastes Chapter 7 King James Version
  Various versions

07